is a Japanese voice actress from Saitama Prefecture.

Filmography

Anime
Desert Punk (Namiko Onami)
Fushigiboshi no Futagohime (Seed Princesses)
Fushigiboshi no Futagohime Gyu! (Noche)
Ga-rei -Zero- (Miku Manabe)
Girls Bravo (Kosame)
Hyōka (Sweets Study Group Girl B)
Kure-nai (Ginko Murakami)
Lucky Star (Inori Hiiragi)
Mahoraba Heartful Days (Mizuho Amane)
Shura no Toki (Shiori/Kisshoumaru)
The Melody of Oblivion (Maid)
White Album (Haruka Kawashima; Sakura-Dan member 7 (ep 6))

External links
 
Official agency profile 

1980 births
Living people
Japanese video game actresses
Japanese voice actresses
Voice actresses from Saitama Prefecture